Clémence Matutu Luwemba (born 26 April 1992) is a Congolese handball player for Serris Val d'Europe and the DR Congo national team.

References

1992 births
Living people
Democratic Republic of the Congo female handball players
Expatriate handball players
Democratic Republic of the Congo expatriates in France
21st-century Democratic Republic of the Congo people